Leon Rękawek (born 3 April 1905, date of death unknown) was a Polish wrestler. He competed in the Greco-Roman lightweight event at the 1924 Summer Olympics.

References

External links
 

1905 births
Year of death missing
Olympic wrestlers of Poland
Wrestlers at the 1924 Summer Olympics
Polish male sport wrestlers
Place of birth missing